Fencing competitions at the 2021 Southeast Asian Games took place at Hanoi Indoor Games Gymnasium in Hanoi, Vietnam from 13 to 18 May 2022.

Summary
Singapore emerged as the best nation in this event again, winning six out of 12 available gold medals and in total 15 medals. Host Vietnam came in second with 5 gold medals and in total 11 medals.

Medal table

Medalists

Men

Women

References

Fencing
Southeast Asian Games
2021